Magdaleno Cano (29 May 1933 – 8 January 2009) was a Mexican cyclist. He competed in the individual and team road race events at the 1956 Summer Olympics.

References

External links
 

1933 births
2009 deaths
Mexican male cyclists
Sportspeople from Guanajuato
Olympic cyclists of Mexico
Cyclists at the 1956 Summer Olympics
People from Celaya